Ekadantha is a 2007 Indian Kannada-language comedy drama film directed and written by Bollywood actor - director Sachin starring Vishnuvardhan, Prema and Ramesh Aravind.  It features soundtrack from Gurukiran.Released on 16 March 2007, the film met with average and critical response at the box-office.
The film is a remake of director's own 2004 Marathi film Navra Maza Navsacha which was inspired by the 1972 Hindi movie Bombay to Goa which in turn was a remake of 1966 Tamil movie Madras to Pondicherry.

Cast
 Vishnuvardhan as Vijay
 Ramesh Arvind as Vakrathunda / Vakky
 Prema as Bhakthi
 Ramesh Bhat as Mallayya
 Mimicry Dayanand as diamond danny
 Umashri as Sheela Devi
 Mandya Ramesh 
 Bank Janardhan as teacher 
 Girija Lokesh as Girija
 Maria Monica Susairaj
Mandeep Rai as Autorickshaw Driver Kishore 
 Kaminidharan
Kamala prakash 
Rachana Mourya 
Roopesh Gowda 
Bhanu Prakash 
Sachin 
Apoorva 
Rathnamaala 
Shivajirao jadhav 
Joe Simon 
Vaijanath Biradar 
Mohan Juneja 
Vijaya saarathi 
M. N. Suresh 
 Gurukiran in a guest appearance as himself

Soundtrack
All the songs are composed and scored by Gurukiran.

References

2007 films
2000s Kannada-language films
Indian comedy-drama films
Kannada remakes of Marathi films
Films scored by Gurukiran
2007 comedy-drama films
Films directed by Sachin (actor)